The term Hijri calendar has more than one meaning. There are three calendars that have the Hijrah as their epoch

In most Islamic countries
 The Islamic calendar, the lunar calendar based on actual lunar observation. It is does not take account of the seasons
The Tabular Islamic calendar, a rule-based variation of the Islamic calendar. It has the same numbering of years and months, but the months are determined by arithmetical rules rather than by observation or astronomical calculations.

In Iran
 The Solar Hijri calendar, whose year begins at the moment of the Spring equinox in the northern hemisphere.